Anemonoides lancifolia (formerly known as Anemone lancifolia), the lanceleaf anemone or mountain thimbleweed, is an herbaceous plant species in the family Ranunculaceae. Plants grow 20 to 30 cm tall, growing from a horizontally orientated rhizome, flowering mid spring to early summer. The flowers have white sepals that are 12–20 mm long. This species much resembles Anemonoides quinquefolia, of which it was formerly considered a subspecies, except that it is larger growing. After flowering fruits called achenes are formed in a small cluster, each achene is 3.5–5 mm long, lacks wings and has a straight or partly curved beak that is 1–1.5 mm long.

Both the Latin and common names reference the leaf shape, which is thinner and with distinctive serration when compared to A. quinquefolia.

It is native to the eastern United States in North Carolina, South Carolina, Virginia, and West Virginia. Anemone lancifolia is normally found growing in rich damp soils in woods.

References

lancifolia
Flora of the Northeastern United States
Flora of the Southeastern United States
Flora without expected TNC conservation status